Salem-Karur Passenger is a passenger train service in Tamil Nadu, India. It is pulled by a WDP-3A locomotive of Trichy shed.

Stoppings
 Salem
 Mallur
 Rasipuram
 Pudhucahatiram
 Kalangani
 Namakkal
 Laddivadi
 Mohanur
 Vangal
 Karur

References

Slow and fast passenger trains in India
Rail transport in Tamil Nadu